Puywan (Quechua for heart of an animal, Hispanicized spelling Puihuan) is a mountain in the northern sector of the Waytapallana mountain range in the Andes of Peru,  about  high. It is situated in the Junín Region, Huancayo Province, Pariahuanca District, and in the Concepción Province, Comas District. Puywan lies southeast of T'illu and northeast of Ch'uspi.

References 

Mountains of Peru
Mountains of Junín Region